McArthur Lake is a lake in Saskatchewan, Canada. It lies in low-relief terrain of the Canadian Shield. The climate is sub-arctic. The land is mostly covered by conifer forests, with some areas of muskeg and rocky outcrops.

Location

The lake contains Charbonneau Island.
It is northwest of Flin Flon, Manitoba, and east of Pelican Narrows, Saskatchewan.
McArthur Lake drains northward into the Churchill River via the Nemei River.
The lake is named in honour of Duncan Archibald McArthur, a private soldier who died on 28 August 1944 during the Allied invasion of Normandy.

Terrain

The terrain consists of roughly parallel sinuous ridges of outcrop separated by muskeg, drift and lakes.
Geologically the area is in the Precambrian Kisseynew complex, underlain by an assemblage of metamorphosed sedimentary rocks that has been intricately folded, with intrusions of sill-like granitic bodies.

The Galbraith Lake folds is an open asymmetric overturned syncline with an axial plane trending 25° NE, dipping very sharply to the east, that extends south from the south end of McArthur Lake to the south of Galbraith Lake.
There are a number of northerly plunging folds between McArthur and Kakinagimak lakes with axial planes 20° NE, dipping sharply to the east.

Environment

The lake is in the subarctic climate zone.
The lake is surrounded by coniferous forest.
The trees are mainly black spruce (Picea mariana), jack pine (Pinus banksiana), poplar (populus) and scattered balsam (populus balsamifera).
There are small patches of moss-covered muskeg that support laurel (kalmia microphylla), labrador tea, and scattered larch and black spruce.

Animals hunted for meat or fur include moose, woodland caribou, black bear, beaver, otter and muskrat.
Spruce partridge are common.

Minerals

Dark gray to black garnet-hornblende gneiss is exposed in an area from north of Bentz Bay to just south of McArthur Lake.
Small areas of hornblende and/or biotite migmatite are found near the lake.
The light to dark gray outcrops are usually rounded and weathered.
Dykes, lenses, and veins of pegmatite are abundant in the meta-sedimentary rocks and granitic bodies between the north of Attitti Lake and McArthur Lake.
The northeast shore of Charbonneau Island has chalcopyrite and pyrite associated with stringers of pink pegmatite in biotite-hornblende migmatite.
In 1958 the Hudson Bay Exploration and Development Company staked claims to this area based on a aerial electromagnetic and magnetometer survey.
The company undertook a geophysical survey and some diamond drilling, then allowed the claims to lapse.

See also
List of lakes of Saskatchewan

Notes

Citations

Sources

 

Lakes of Saskatchewan